David Larose (born 4 July 1985 in Bondy, France) is a French judoka. He competed for France at the 2012 Summer Olympics.

Achievements

References

External links

 
 
 

1985 births
Living people
French male judoka
Olympic judoka of France
Judoka at the 2012 Summer Olympics
European Games medalists in judo
European Games gold medalists for France
Judoka at the 2015 European Games
Sportspeople from Bondy
20th-century French people
21st-century French people